The Melbourne Formation is a geologic formation in Victoria, Australia. It preserves fossils dating back to the Ludlow epoch of the Silurian period.

Description 

The Melbourne Formation, part of the Murrindindi Supergroup, is conformably overlain by the Humevale Formation and overlies the Yan Yean and Anderson Creek Formations. The formation comprises mainly thin-bedded siltstone and sandstones. Most beds show undisturbed Bouma sequences.

Fossil content 
The following fossils were reported from the formation:

Eurypterids 
 Pterygotus australis

Trilobites 
 Encrinurus simpliciculus
 Trilobita indet.

Brachiopods 
 Aegiria thomasi
 ?Leptostrophia sp.
 cf. Phoenicitoechia sp.

Gastropods 
 Bellerophontidae indet.

Bivalves 
 Ctenodontella sp.
 cf. Ctenodonta spp.

Scyphozoa 
 Conulariidae indet.

Corals 
 Cladopora spp.
 cf. Alveolites sp.

Ophiuroidea 
 Mausoleaster sugarloafensis
 Protaster sp.

Crinoids 
 Dendrocrinus saundersi
 Kooptoonocrinus nutti
 Dimerocrinitidae indet.

See also 
 Tumblagooda Sandstone, Silurian geologic formation in Western Australia
 Yea Flora Fossil Site, Silurian fossil site in Victoria

References

Bibliography

Further reading 
 Schleiger, N.W., 1974, Statistical methods for analysis and mapping of flysch-type sediments., Sedimentology, 21(2), p223-249

Geologic formations of Australia
Silurian System of Australia
Ludlow epoch
Sandstone formations
Siltstone formations
Mudstone formations
Turbidite deposits
Silurian northern paleotropical deposits
Silurian southern paleotropical deposits
Paleontology in Victoria
Geology of Victoria (Australia)